Zielęcin may refer to the following places:
Zielęcin, Greater Poland Voivodeship (west-central Poland)
Zielęcin, Pajęczno County in Łódź Voivodeship (central Poland)
Zielęcin, Sieradz County in Łódź Voivodeship (central Poland)